Zaara Street Power Station is a former coal-fired power station that was situated on Zaara Street, in the city of , in New South Wales, Australia. The station was decommissioned in 1975 and demolished in 1978.

History
In 1920 the Zaara Street Power Station started with a  Curtis GE turbo-alt (No.2) from White Bay and a  GE turbo-alt (No.3A) both delivering 6.6kV at 25Hz (1500rpm). Additional power was needed in 1921 and another  Vickers-Willans alternator (No.3B) was added. Steam was supplied by 4 Babcock & Wilcox WIF long drum chain grate boilers.

1922 saw a  British Thompson Houston 50Hz (3000rpm) alternator (No.4A) and a  Parsons alternator (No.1) added. More power was required in 1924 and a  BTH alternator (No.5) was installed. This was followed in 1928 by another  BTH alternator (No.6). Terminal voltage for these 50Hz machines was 11kV. Four extra boilers were installed from 1930 to supply these machines. The last change to the low pressure plant was that the No.1 Parsons  alternator was removed and in its place a  Bellis & Morcom alternator (No.1) in 1936.

Surplus capacity in the Railway Commissioner's power grid was sold to municipal councils and other bodies responsible for the supply of electricity to the general public. Zaara Street Power Station was connected to the grid of the Electricity Supply Department of the Newcastle Borough Council in 1917, and supplied much of Newcastle's electricity needs throughout the 1920s. Built in the 1890s, 'NESCA' Power Station was situated approximately one mile from Zaara Street, and closed in 1953.

High pressure plant
In 1939 a different approach was taken to supply more power more reliably. The first addition was a  Brush-Ljunstrom 50Hz turbo-alternator (No.4). The next year a  Fraser + Chalmers ex-Pyrmont alternator was placed in the No.3 position. Steam was supplied for all the high pressure plant by four Babcock & Wilcox high head boilers. A  British Thomson Houston alternator (No.4) was delivered in 1942 and a  Westinghouse alternator (No.5) installed in 1944. The No.5  machine became the number 7 alternator at this time to avoid confusion. Also, the No.2  machine was replaced with a slightly larger  Dick Kerr alternator (No.2), ex-White Bay.

Control of Zaara Street was transferred from the NSWGR to the Electricity Commission of New South Wales on 1 January 1953. By the 1960s only the new boilers and sets 4, 5 & 7 were still in operation. The ECNSW continued to operate the power station until it was officially closed in 1975.

Zaara Street Power Station was demolished in 1978, and all railway facilities in the vicinity were redeveloped into what is now known as The Foreshore. No traces of the power station have survived on the site.

References

Decommissioned power stations in New South Wales
Coal-fired power stations in New South Wales
1915 establishments in Australia
1978 disestablishments in Australia
Buildings and structures demolished in 1978
Demolished buildings and structures in New South Wales